Rasuk is a surname. Notable people with the surname include:

Silvestre Rasuk (born 1987), American actor
Victor Rasuk (born 1984), American actor

de:Rasuk